The Canyonside School is a schoolhouse located  south of Jerome, Idaho, USA. The lava rock building was constructed by the stonemason H.T. Pugh in 1920; it was one of four stone rural schools built by him. The school replaced several wooden school buildings in the area and was considered a sign of the region's agricultural prosperity, as farming in the area was profitable enough to sustain long-term investments in its educational infrastructure. The building is now a private home.

The school was listed on the National Register of Historic Places in 1983.

References

See also
 List of National Historic Landmarks in Idaho
 National Register of Historic Places listings in Jerome County, Idaho

1920 establishments in Idaho
Buildings and structures in Jerome County, Idaho
School buildings completed in 1920
School buildings on the National Register of Historic Places in Idaho
National Register of Historic Places in Jerome County, Idaho